Tham Yew Chin (born 1950), known by her pseudonym You Jin,  is a Singaporean writer. She received the Cultural Medallion Award in 2009 for her contributions to Singapore's literary arts scene.

Early life and family
Tham was born 1950 in Ipoh, British Malaya. Her family relocated to Singapore when she was eight years old. Moving to Singapore, she suffered from a language barrier as she only spoke Cantonese. Her father was a construction worker, and her paternal grandfather was an immigrant from then-poverty-torn China.

Career
Tham has published close to 160 literary works under the pseudonym of You Jin. In 2009, she received the Cultural Medallion in literary arts for the first time. Tham contributed an essay titled A Fish in Water for former Prime Minister of Singapore Lee Kuan Yew's 2012 book, My Lifelong Challenge: Singapore's Bilingual Journey.

In 2012, Tham's writing was translated into English for the first time. Her 2004 collection of short stories, was translated by Sylvia Li-chun Lin and published by Epigram Books as Teaching Cats to Jump Hoops as part of its Cultural Medallion series. Her 2005 autobiography, A Life in Words (} was then translated by Shelly Bryant and published in 2016 by the same company, marking the fourth time she would win the award.

In 2014, three of Tham's books, Jinse Daishu, Release Your Happiness and Even The Heart Soars, entered the Singapore Literature Prize shortlist for Chinese fiction and non-fiction. Eventually, Even The Heart Soars won a merit award for Chinese non-fiction.

Awards
 1982: National Book Development Council of Singapore Book Award
 1991: National Book Development Council of Singapore Book Award
 1991: Singapore Chinese Literary Award (from the Singapore Literature Society)
 1996: Montblanc-NUS Centre for the Arts Literary Award
 2009: Cultural Medallion for Literature

Selected works

 词选赏析 (1973, 华文中学教师会) 
 电神和雷魔 : 泰国民间故事 / The Tale of Lightning and Thunder (1980, 彩艺出版公司) 
 大胡子的春与冬 (1989, 新亚出版社) 
 风筝在云里笑 (1989, 东升出版社, 热带出版社) 
 尘世浮雕 (1990, 成功出版社) 
 含笑的蜻蜓 (1991, 教育出版公司) 
 方格子里的世界 : 尤今的足迹 (1992, 四川文艺出版社) 
 灯影內的人生 : 尤今散文选粹 (1992, 四川文艺出版社) 
 百年苦乐 (1993, 新亚出版社) 
 家在新加坡 : 尤今散文新作 (1993, 四川文艺出版社) 
 结局 (1993, 吉林人民出版社) 
 活在羊群里的人 (1994, 新亚出版社) 
 长屋生涯原是梦 (1995, 浙江文艺出版社) 
 瑰丽的旋涡 (1995, 教育出版公司) 
 回首叫云飞风起 (1995, 浙江文艺出版社) 
 跌碎的彩虹 (1996, 教育出版公司) 
 华义文圃. 第十期, 学海无涯 (1997, 华义中学中文学会)  
 荒谷 (1997, 新亚出版社) 
 大地的珠宝 (1998, 新亚出版社) 
 黑色的稻米 (1999, 2000, SNP Editions) 
 吹笛子的人 (2001, 重庆出版社) 
 豆花不撒谎 (2005, 玲子传媒) 
 大地的耳朵 (2007, 玲子传媒) 
 缤纷城事 (2008, 四川人民出版社) 
 缤纷城事 : 随尤今的足迹, 听都市的声音 (2008, 玲子传媒) 
 爱恨交缠的瘀痕 (2010, Pearson Education South Asia Pte Ltd) 
 爱是一朵花 (2010, 江苏文艺出版社) 
 寸寸土地皆故事 (2010, 新加坡青年书局) 
 等待国旗的人 (2010, 新加坡青年书局)

References

1950 births
Singaporean writers
Living people
Recipients of the Cultural Medallion for literature
Singaporean people of Cantonese descent
Malaysian emigrants to Singapore